Herbert Vorgrimler (4 January 1929 – 12 September 2014) was a Catholic theologian and author who published over 90 books in German, 33 of which were translated into English.

Works

Vorgrimler is known for his collaboration in 1965 with Karl Rahner, SJ, on the Theological Dictionary.

In Sacramental Theology, Vorgrimler describes a dogmatic approach to the sacraments where he follows St. Thomas Aquinas in relating the sacraments directly to Christ but he also expands on the role of the Church. Sacramental activity thus encompasses all of God's activity towards the Church because it always involves the elements of humanity and mystery / sacred. Vorgrimler is conscious of the distinction between sacramental activity and sacraments and understands the seven sacraments as existing objectively in the world, though not on their own grounds but always in relation to Christ and the Church.

List of Publications
Sacramental Theology, translated by Linda M. Maloney, Minnesota 1992

References

1929 births
2014 deaths
20th-century German Catholic theologians
German male non-fiction writers